Postal codes in Iceland are made up of three digits. The codes are followed by the name of the place where the post is being distributed, which is either a municipality, the nearest city, town or village. The total number of postal codes is 149; with 18 reserved for post-office boxes, two for public institutes and larger private companies and one used for international sorting purposes only.

See also
Addresses in Iceland

External links
Iceland Post 
Iceland Post 

Postal codes
Postal system of Iceland
Iceland